Marlyse Nsourou (born 27 February 1987) is a Gabonese middle-distance runner. She competed in the women's 800 metres at the 2004 Summer Olympics.

References

External links
 

1987 births
Living people
Athletes (track and field) at the 2004 Summer Olympics
Gabonese female middle-distance runners
Olympic athletes of Gabon
Place of birth missing (living people)
21st-century Gabonese people